Harlem, Illinois may refer to:

 Harlem, Illinois
 Forest Park, Illinois, a Chicago incorporated Suburb formerly named Harlem.